Matías Raúl Lucuix (born 20 November 1985) is an Argentine futsal manager and retired player, who played for the Argentina national team, which he is its current head coach.

References

External links
FIFA profile
LNFS profile

1985 births
Living people
Argentine men's futsal players
Sportspeople from Buenos Aires
Inter FS players
Argentine expatriate sportspeople in Spain
Argentine sports coaches
Futsal coaches
Pan American Games silver medalists for Argentina
Futsal players at the 2007 Pan American Games
Medalists at the 2007 Pan American Games
Pan American Games medalists in futsal